Dança dos Famosos 2016 is the thirteenth season of the Brazilian reality television show Dança dos Famosos which premiered on August 21, 2016, with the competitive live shows beginning on the following week on August 28, 2016 at 7:30 p.m./6:30 p.m. (BRT/AMT) on Rede Globo.

On December 11, 2016, actor Felipe Simas & Carol Agnelo won the competition over actress & singer Sophia Abrahão & Rodrigo Oliveira and actor Rainer Cadete & Juliana Valcézia, who took 2nd and 3rd place respectively.

Couples

Elimination chart

Key
 
 
  Eliminated
  Bottom two
  Dance-off
  Withdrew
  Third place
  Runner-up
  Winner

Weekly results

Week 1 

 Presentation of the Celebrities

Aired: August 21, 2016

Week 2 
Week 1 – Men
Style: 2000s Disco
Aired: August 28, 2016

Running order

Week 3 
Week 1 – Women
Style: 2000s Disco
Aired: September 4, 2016

Running order

Week 4 
Week 2 – Men
Style: Forró
Aired: September 11, 2016(pre-taped on Saturday, September 3)

Running order

Week 5 
Week 2 – Women
Style: Forró
Aired: September 18, 2016

Running order

Week 6 
Week 3 – Men
Style: Funk
Aired: September 25, 2016

Running order

Week 7 
Week 3 – Women
Style: Funk
Aired: October 2, 2016

Running order

Week 8 
Week 4 – Men
Style: Rock and Roll
Aired: October 9, 2016(pre-taped on Saturday, October 1)

Running order

Week 9 
Week 4 – Women
Style: Rock and Roll
Aired: October 16, 2016

Running order

Week 10 
Dance-off
Style: Zouk
Aired: October 23, 2016

Running order

Week 11 
Team A
Style: Foxtrot feat. Tap
Aired: October 30, 2016

Running order

Week 12 
Team B
Style: Foxtrot feat. Tap
Aired: November 6, 2016

Running order

Week 13 
Top 7
Style: Salsa
Aired: November 13, 2016

Running order

Week 14 
Top 6
Style: Country
Aired: November 20, 2016

Running order

Week 15 
Top 5
Style: Waltz
Aired: November 27, 2016

Running order

Week 16 
Top 4 – Semifinals
Style: Pasodoble
Aired: December 4, 2016

Running order

Week 17 
Top 3 – Finals
Style: Tango & Samba
Aired: December 11, 2016

Running order

References

External links
 

2016 Brazilian television seasons
Season 13